Evric Lee Gray (born December 13, 1969) is an American former professional basketball player. He was a  small forward.

College career
Gray played college basketball at UNLV.

Professional career
Gray played in the National Basketball Association (NBA), with the New Jersey Nets. He also played professionally in Europe.

Personal life
His daughter, Alexa Gray, was an accomplished volleyball player at BYU, plays on the Canadian national team, and plays professionally in Italy.

References

External links 
NBA.com Profile
NBA Career Stats
FIBA Europe Profile
Italian League Profile 

1969 births
Living people
American expatriate basketball people in Greece
American expatriate basketball people in Italy
American men's basketball players
Atlantic City Seagulls players
Basketball players from California
Fort Wayne Fury players
Gimnasia y Esgrima de Comodoro Rivadavia basketball players
Greek Basket League players
New Jersey Nets players
San Diego Wildcards players
Small forwards
Undrafted National Basketball Association players
UNLV Runnin' Rebels basketball players